The 2014–15 Olympique de Marseille season was the 65th professional season of the club since its creation in 1899 and 19th consecutive season in the top flight.

This was the first season in ten years that Marseille did not participate in the UEFA Champions League or UEFA Europa League, having finished sixth in the 2013–14 Ligue 1 season. The club was coached by legendary Argentine tactician Marcelo Bielsa, who signed a two-year contract in May 2014.

This was also the first season in which the side played at the renovated Stade Vélodrome, with the stadium having completed renovations which took place over the last three years. Capacity went up to 67,000 - from 48,000 last season, and 42,000 the season before. The stadium is rated five-star by UEFA, and was used ahead for the UEFA Euro 2016.

Players

French teams are limited to four players without EU citizenship. Hence, the squad list includes only the principal nationality of each player; several non-European players on the squad have dual citizenship with an EU country. Also, players from the ACP countries—countries in Africa, the Caribbean, and the Pacific that are signatories to the Cotonou Agreement—are not counted against non-EU quotas due to the Kolpak ruling.

Current squad

.

Coaching Staff

Transfers
The club made their first transfer of the season in June when they signed Belgian striker Michy Batshuayi for a rumoured €8 million from Standard Liège. The club then signed Romain Alessandrini, the Marseille-born Rennes winger for €5 million a few days later.

So far, Larry Azouni has been transferred to Nîmes and Florian Raspentino has departed to Caen.

In

Out

Competitions

Pre-season and friendlies

Ligue 1

League table

Results summary

Results by round

Matches

Coupe de France

Coupe de la Ligue

Statistics

Appearances and goals

|-
! colspan=12 style=background:#dcdcdc; text-align:center| Goalkeepers

|-
! colspan=12 style=background:#dcdcdc; text-align:center| Defenders

|-
! colspan=12 style=background:#dcdcdc; text-align:center| Midfielders

|-
! colspan=12 style=background:#dcdcdc; text-align:center| Forwards

|-
! colspan=12 style="background:#dcdcdc; text-align:center"| Players transferred out during the season

References

Olympique de Marseille seasons
Marseille